The HESA Kaman-12 is an Iranian unmanned aerial vehicle operated by the Islamic Republic of Iran Air Force. Its first flight was on 11 September 2020. The unmanned aerial vehicle possesses a speed of 200 km/h, with a range of 1,000 kilometers, and its one-way range is approximately 2,000 km.

Description 
This UAV was first presented at the "Iqtedar-40" exhibition of defense achievements of the "Armed Forces of the Islamic Republic of Iran", has a speed of about 200 kilometers per hour and a flight duration of 10 hours. Among this unmanned aerial vehicle specifications are as follows:

Capability to take-off from runways with at least a length of 400 meters, possessing an operating-radius of one thousand km, the capability to carry cargoes of 100 kg and its max-weight while taking off --from the ground-- is approximately 450 kg.

Another trait which has made this remote-controlled bird as one of the most up-to-date UAVs is as follows: "Its 1000 kilometer flight range" and "2000 kilometer one-way range". As well as this, Kaman-12 has a lift coefficient of 1.8, acceleration tolerance limit: 2-5 +, maximum weight of remotely piloted aircraft four hundred and fifty kg, minimum (UAV) weight 230 kg and other features.

See also 
 List of military equipment manufactured in Iran
 Armed Forces of the Islamic Republic of Iran
 Defense industry of Iran
 Akhgar (missile)

References

 

 

Unmanned military aircraft of Iran
Iranian military aircraft
Aircraft manufactured in Iran
Islamic Republic of Iran Air Force
Post–Cold War military equipment of Iran
Unmanned aerial vehicles of Iran